George Lumsden  (12 March 1815 – 11 February 1904) was a 19th-century New Zealand politician.

Biography

Lumsden was born in Fife, Scotland, in 1815. He learned the trade of watchmaker from his uncle at Pittenweem. Lumsden and his wife Christina (née Anderson, married 1842) emigrated to Geelong, Australia, in 1858 on the Ravenseraig. He joined the gold rush in Ballarat, but returned to his watchmakers shop in Geelong. In 1861, they moved to Invercargill.

He was Mayor of Invercargill in 1873–1874 and again in 1878–1879. He represented the Invercargill electorate in Parliament from 1875 to 1878, when he resigned, as absence from his jewellery shop was affecting his business.

The Lumsdens had eight children. Their son Thomas James Lumsden was born in 1854.

References

1815 births
1904 deaths
Burials at Eastern Cemetery, Invercargill
Members of the New Zealand House of Representatives
Members of the Otago Provincial Council
Members of the Southland Provincial Council
Invercargill City Councillors
Mayors of Invercargill
New Zealand MPs for South Island electorates
Unsuccessful candidates in the 1871 New Zealand general election
Unsuccessful candidates in the 1884 New Zealand general election
19th-century New Zealand politicians